South Carolina Highway 781 (SC 781) is a  primary state highway in the U.S. state of South Carolina. It is used as part of a bypass south of Aiken, between Augusta and Williston, in conjunction with U.S. Route 278 (US 278).

Route description
SC 781 is a two-lane rural connector highway between US 278 and US 78.

History
Established in 1940 as a new primary route, it traversed from SC 28 in Beech Island east to US 78 west of Williston. In 1953, SC 781 was truncated to its current western terminus, replaced by a rerouted SC 28 (later became US 278 in 1965).

Major intersections

See also

References

External links

 
 SC 781 at Virginia Highways' South Carolina Highways Annex

781
Transportation in Aiken County, South Carolina
U.S. Route 278